James or Jim Russell may refer to:

Entertainment
 Jim Russell (actor), Australian comedian and actor
 Jim Russell (cartoonist) (1909–2001), Australian cartoonist
 James Russell (director), British music and events video director
 James Russell (garden designer) (1920–1996), English garden designer
 James Russell (born 1936), pseudonym of British author Terry Harknett

Law
 James Russell (law reporter) (1790–1861), Scottish barrister and law reporter
 James Cholmeley Russell (1841–1912), barrister, financier, and Welsh railway entrepreneur
 James George Russell (1848–1918), Australian lawyer and public servant
 James Russell (judge) (died 1893), Chief Justice of Hong Kong
 James Russell (Canadian judge) (born 1949), Canadian judge

Politics
 James McPherson Russell (1786–1870), U.S. Representative from Pennsylvania
 James Russell (New Brunswick politician) (1824–1915), farmer and political figure in New Brunswick, Canada
 James Alexander Russell (1846–1918), Scottish physician and Lord Provost of Edinburgh
 James C. Russell (1928–2016), American politician in Missouri
 James Russell (Newfoundland politician) (born 1940), educator and political figure in Newfoundland and Labrador, Canada

Religion
 J. Stuart Russell (1816–1895), pastor and author of The Parousia
 James Curdie Russell (1830–1925), Scottish minister
 James Solomon Russell (1857–1935), Episcopal priest and educator

Science
 James Russell (surgeon) (1754–1836), Scottish doctor
 James Russell (inventor) (born 1931), American inventor
 James A. Russell (born 1947), American psychologist
 James Russell III, atmospheric scientist
 James Russell (ecologist), New Zealand
 James Burn Russell (1837–1904), Scottish doctor, Glasgow's first Medical Officer of Health, Chief Medical Officer for Scotland
 James Samuel Risien Russell (1863–1939), Guyanese-British physician and professor of medicine

Sports
 James Russell (Australian footballer) (1931–1969), Australian rules footballer
 Jimmy Russell (1879–1925), Australian rules footballer for Melbourne
 Jim Russell (footballer) (1916–1994), Scottish professional footballer
 James Russell (Scottish footballer), Scottish footballer
 Jim Russell (racing driver) (1920–2019), English racing driver
 Jim Russell (ice hockey) (1918–1977), Canadian ice hockey player
 Jim Russell (baseball) (1918–1987), American baseball outfielder
 James Russell (baseball) (born 1986), Major League Baseball pitcher

Other
 James Sargent Russell (1903–1996), Vice Admiral in the United States Navy
 Jim Russell (journalist) (born 1946), American journalist and producer
 James R. Russell (born 1953), American professor of Ancient Near East studies

See also
 Russell (surname)